"Regional Holiday Music" is the tenth episode and mid-season finale of the third season of the American television series Community, and 59th overall episode of the series. It was originally broadcast on December 8, 2011 on NBC and is the final episode before the show went on hiatus during the 2011–12 midseason. The Christmas-themed episode is a musical featuring original songs performed by cast members. After Greendale's glee club members become incapacitated, the study group is asked to join. Despite their dislike of the club, each of them is lured into joining after their vulnerabilities are exploited.

The episode was directed by Tristram Shapeero and written by Steve Basilone and Annie Mebane. The musical format, along with other more subtle elements in the episode is a parody of the Fox television series Glee. Creator Dan Harmon is known to dislike Glee and the series has satirized aspects of the musical TV series in previous episodes. The premise of "Regional Holiday Music" also draws on an event in season 2's "Paradigms of Human Memory" (Communitys "clip show") and provides closure to it. Taran Killam guest-starred as the glee club instructor.

The episode received mostly positive reviews, with many critics disagreeing with NBC's decision to bench the series. Critics praised the episode's high-concept satire and character-driven moments. Opinion was divided on the quality of the original songs. According to Nielsen Media Research, "Regional Holiday Music" was seen by an estimated 3.6 million viewers, a drop from the previous week.

Plot
While meeting in the cafeteria, the study group reveal their plans for Christmas. Some are spending time away, disappointing Abed (Danny Pudi), who had wished to spend the holidays with the group, even renting the critically reviled Inspector Spacetime holiday special to watch with them. Their conversation is interrupted by a performance by the obnoxious Greendale glee club. Midway through, Chang (Ken Jeong) stops them with a cease and desist order from ASCAP—tipped off by Jeff (Joel McHale)—for performing copyrighted music without permission. The glee club members suffer a nervous breakdown and are taken to the hospital.

The glee club instructor, Cory "Mr. Rad" Radison (Taran Killam), invites the study group to join and perform the Christmas pageant but is rebuffed promptly due to their collective dislike for the club. However, through a series of events performed as songs, the members of the group are lured into joining the club one by one.
"Glee": Mr. Rad manages to convince Abed to join the club by tapping into Abed's desire to spend Christmas with the group.
"Christmas Infiltration": Troy (Donald Glover) is next to join when Abed creates a scenario where he can infiltrate the glee club for the Jehovah's Witnesses. Troy then raps about going undercover to make it seem like he accepts Christmas.
"Baby Boomer Santa": Troy and Abed exploit Pierce's (Chevy Chase) baby boomer narcissism using mixed musical styles associated with each of the decades Pierce has lived through.
"Teach Me How to Understand Christmas": Before this song, Annie (Alison Brie) catches the glee club virus after being cornered by Troy, Abed, and Mr. Rad. She then dresses up in a sexy Santa outfit to seduce Jeff.
"Happy Birthday Jesus": Pierce invites a children's choir to sing to Shirley about how the public school system has thrown out the meaning of Christmas (the birth of Jesus) during its celebrations. Unable to resist her religious fervor, Shirley springs into song, proclaiming "Happy Birthday Jesus!"

With Britta (Gillian Jacobs) the only non-glee club member left, she seeks out Jeff, only to find that Annie successfully turned him, and he in turn manages to sway Britta.

As they are backstage preparing for the Christmas pageant, Mr. Rad tells Abed of his plans to take the group to "Regionals" and many further glee competitions. As Abed had only made the group join to brighten up Christmas, he decides to sabotage the pageant so that Mr. Rad cannot take them to Regionals. While the group performs "Planet Christmas" on stage, he asks Britta (who was originally cast as the mute tree) to replace him as the Mouse King. She does and ruins the pageant with her poor singing and badly improvised lyrics and choreography. Despite Mr. Rad's objections, Dean Pelton (Jim Rash) and the audience supportively agree to "let Britta sing her awkward song" in the spirit of inclusion. Mr. Rad becomes enraged at the idea and inadvertently reveals that he killed the previous glee club members when they did not live up to his expectations, then runs off. Abed regretfully concedes that "forcing things to be bright just makes the darkness underneath it even darker."

Back at the apartment, Abed is watching the Inspector Spacetime holiday special alone. The rest of the group arrive, singing "The First Noel", and announce that after a dark year, they have cancelled their plans in order to spend the holidays with him. The episode ends with the group watching Inspector Spacetime together.

Production

"Regional Holiday Music" was written by Steve Basilone and Annie Mebane, both their debut writing credits for the series. It was directed by Tristram Shapeero, his seventh directing credit. The music for the episode was composed by series composer Ludwig Göransson, with lyrics by the writing staff.

The episode took six days to shoot, which Danny Pudi said is one of the longest for a single episode.

Taran Killam, a cast member of Saturday Night Live, guest starred as glee club instructor Cory Radison. Killam previously worked with Community executive producers Neil Goldman and Garrett Donovan in the pilot of Nobody's Watching. The show was not picked up.

Series creator Dan Harmon has long been known to dislike Glee. Community has parodied the musical television series in previous episodes. In "Modern Warfare", the show referenced Glees lack of original music. In "Paradigms of Human Memory", the study group fills in for the glee club members who died in a bus crash, though they sing a song with no real lyrics. These events are brought up during "Regional Holiday Music", which also reveals the true reason behind the crash.

Following the footsteps of season 2's "Abed's Uncontrollable Christmas", Abed spends the episode trying to get the group to embrace the holiday spirit during Christmas.

Cultural references
"Regional Holiday Music" is a satire-at-large of the television series Glee. The audio transitions for this episode mimic the a cappella audio transitions featured in Glee, whilst the glee club instructor Cory Radison ("Mr. Rad") shares many similarities to Will Schuester ("Mr. Schue"). The episode also makes reference to the concept of "Regionals", which would be confusing to people who haven't watched the show. Unlike most songs on Glee, the music on "Regional Holiday Music" is entirely original.

Jeff remarks in a scene that not liking the glee club does not make the group bullies, in reference to Glee creator Ryan Murphy's criticism of musicians who don't want their music on the show. When Mr. Rad reveals that he killed previous glee club members, he shouts "Look, Kings of Leon!" to distract the audience before escaping. Kings of Leon had previously clashed with Murphy over permission to use their songs on Glee.

The song "Glee" speaks about the namesake series' characters' tendency to sing their feelings instead of "making a face." While performing "Baby Boomer Santa", Troy and Abed recreate musical styles from the 1940s to 1980s, including performing "Dancing in the Dark" and Troy impersonating Bob Dylan. 
The episode continues the show's recurring spoof of the British television series Doctor Who through Inspector Spacetime, while also making a nod to the infamous 1978 Star Wars Holiday Special. While the group discusses their Christmas plans, Annie reveals she will spend time with her bubbe (the Yiddish word for grandmother), which Troy confuses for "boobie" (breast). The scene where Britta discovers that Jeff has been turned is a spoof of the ending of the 1978 remake of Invasion of the Body Snatchers.

In the end tag, the heads of the Dean (Jim Rash), Chang (Ken Jeong), Magnitude (Luke Youngblood), Starburns (Dino Stamatopoulos) and Leonard (Richard Erdman) are superimposed on ornaments as they perform a version of "Carol of the Bells" using their names and a few recurring lines.

Reception

Ratings
In its original American broadcast, "Regional Holiday Music" was viewed by an estimated 3.6 million households, with a Nielsen rating/share of 1.5/4 in the 18–49 demographic. It finished fourth in its 8 pm time slot among broadcast networks and was outperformed by CBS sitcom The Big Bang Theory, which was seen by 14.4 million households; Fox reality show The X Factor, which was seen by 9.9 million households; and a special holiday episode of ABC reality show Wipeout, which was seen by 6.6 million households. The episode outperformed a repeat airing of The Vampire Diaries on The CW, which was seen by 1.2 million households. Community was NBC's lowest performing show of the night in the demographic despite The Office, Parks and Recreation and Whitney all slipping to season lows.

Reviews
"Regional Holiday Music" received mostly positive reviews from critics, many of whom pleaded for the show to return. BuddyTV placed it #17 in its list of 50 best TV episodes of 2011, calling the songs the "best original songs TV has heard in a long time".

Emily VanDerWerff of The A.V. Club gave the episode an 'A', saying "Community is going away for a while, but it's going away with an episode that reminds me why I love the show so much. This is a very personal thing—since humor's subjective like that—but for me, this was the funniest episode since the clip show... I laughed myself silly at this one, to the point where I was devolving into hiccups at certain scenes, and I'm glad we get to go out on an episode like this, one that plays around with form and makes me laugh." Alan Sepinwall of HitFix also praised the Glee-spoofing, saying "'Regional Holiday Music' was the logical, clever, funny endpoint to it." Sean Gandert of Paste said, "As with its best theme-episodes, the show bridged the gap between high-concept parody and character-based comedy." TV Fanatic's Leigh Raines gave the episode a 4/5 rating, saying while the show "definitely went out with a bang, it didn't totally blow my socks off... While there were a few moments that upped the ick factor, overall this episode fell on the positive side." She praised Troy and Abed's rap performance, but called the scene where Annie seduces Jeff "creepy". Robert Canning of IGN said it was a "great" episode, but "faltered just a bit" at the end: "Abed's realization that his attempts to brighten the holiday only made things darker, as Jeff had previously suggested, fit the character well enough, but the study group's follow-up felt a bit forced and holiday hokey. Of course, that could well have been the point."

Kelsea Stahler of Hollywood.com gave the episode a bad review, calling the original songs "terrible". She remarked, "fans merit a better episode, better commentary, and better parody of the subject at hand." Nonetheless, she praised the episode's ending and asked, "Who cares that the story was a bit weak this time around? It's the last episode we have before the dreaded undetermined hiatus gets underway, and it's Christmas. Let's just cherish the episode for what it is..." Sean Campbell said although he enjoyed the episode's concept, "the execution left much to be desired" and that the quality of the songs "varied from okay to bad".

The Atlantics Kevin Fallon compared "Regional Holiday Music" to Glees own 2011 Christmas episode "Extraordinary Merry Christmas" which aired on December 13. Fallon said "Regional Holiday Music" "relentlessly exposed Glees most repetitive cliches" and "couldn't have invented better illustrations of Glees cringe-inducing, everyone-is-loved-as-long-as-they-sing-a-song motif." However, on a final note, he highlighted the two shows' similarities, explaining how both shows stick to their bold delivery and heartwarming moments.

References

External links
 "Regional Holiday Music" at NBC.com
 

2011 American television episodes
American Christmas television episodes
Community (season 3) episodes
Musical television episodes